Bukuya is a town in the Mubende District in the Central Region of Uganda.

Location
The coordinates of the town are 0°40'28.0"N, 31°50'05.0"E (Latitude:0.674454; Longitude:31.834716).

Overview
The Myanzi–Kassanda–Bukuya–Kiboga Road passes through the middle of town. Bukuya Primary School (BPS) is an elementary school in Bukuya town. BPS is linked with St. Martin's Church of England Primary School, in East End, Newbury, Berks, United Kingdom. The two schools exchange teachers.

See also
 List of cities and towns in Uganda

References

External links
Website of Mubende District Local Government

Populated places in Central Region, Uganda
Cities in the Great Rift Valley
Mubende District